Rachel Ann Goswell (born 16 May 1971) is an English singer-songwriter and musician who rose to prominence as vocalist and guitarist of the shoegaze band Slowdive, which formed in 1989. Goswell, along with Neil Halstead, Ian McCutcheon and former Chapterhouse member Simon Rowe became Mojave 3 when Slowdive transitioned to a more country/folk rock style. She released a solo album in 2004, titled Waves Are Universal on 4AD Records.

Early life
Goswell was born in Fareham, Hampshire, England. Her family relocated to Wales after her birth, and later to Reading, Berkshire when she was seven, where she spent the remainder of her youth. She is the second of two children, with one older brother.

Her father taught her folk guitar songs beginning at age seven, and she began studying classical guitar and music theory at age ten. Goswell took classical guitar lessons along with childhood friend Neil Halstead, with whom she formed Slowdive in 1989. Regarding her musical influences, she stated: "For me personally, from a singing point of view, I was inspired by Siouxsie Sioux", "it was [she] who made me want to be a singer." Joni Mitchell, Iggy Pop and Nick Cave were her other favorite singers. Goswell is also inspired by the Cocteau Twins; she discovered their music at 16 and "found myself immersed in the magic and wonder of their overall sound musically." The songs that influenced her the most were: "There Is A Light That Never Goes Out" by The Smiths, "92 Degrees" from Siouxsie and the Banshees'  Tinderbox album, "Persephone" from Cocteau Twins' Treasure album and "River" from Joni Mitchell's Blue album.

Career

Goswell formed the indie rock band the Pumpkin Fairies with Neil Halstead, Adrian Sell and Nick Chaplin in 1988, after having played in several cover bands in Reading. When the Pumpkin Fairies dissolved in 1989, the group then formed Slowdive in the same year.  She was a member of Slowdive until the band's dissolution in 1995. After the disbandment, Goswell and Halstead formed Mojave 3, an offshoot of Slowdive; the group captured a more folk rock-oriented sound as opposed to Slowdive's shoegaze sound. They released five albums, their last being Puzzles Like You in 2006, before going on a hiatus.

The year 2004 saw Goswell release solo recordings with co-writer Joe Light and producer David Naughton. Nine months after Mojave 3 released Spoon and Rafter, she released The Sleep Shelter EP. Waves Are Universal, her first full-length recording, appeared a month later. Tiny Mix Tapes described the record as "delicate and well-thought out" despite occasionally veering towards "the frankly repulsive world of adult contemporary" while Pitchfork Media thought the album was "warm [and] summery ... agreeable, if not very exciting". Stylus Magazine stated that Waves Are Universal is "a solid album that could appeal to both fans of [Goswell's] previous work and others". In February 2005, a limited edition remix 12" (also available as a download) entitled Coastline/Plucked was issued and features two mixes apiece from the Earlies and Ulrich Schnauss.

In 2014, Slowdive, with Goswell, reformed for gigs and have declared in interviews that they would be working on new material. The band continue to tour. In 2016 Goswell joined Stuart Braithwaite, Justin Lockey and James Lockey to form the band Minor Victories. Their self-titled debut was released in June 2016 on Fat Possum Records.

In April 2019, Goswell and her husband Steve Clarke announced a new musical project called the Soft Cavalry. On 5 July 2019, the duo released their self titled EP, which since then has been acclaimed by critics.

Personal life
Goswell was married to Air Cuba's Christopher Andrews from 1994 until 2000.

In 2018, Goswell married Steve Clarke, Slowdive's tour manager.

Goswell is partially deaf as a result of labyrinthitis (a viral infection) which occurred in 2006. This left her with chronic tinnitus in one ear and she also had debilitating balance problems which required physiotherapy for a year. As a result, Goswell had to stop playing and touring with Mojave 3.

In 2010 Goswell gave birth to a son, Jesse, who has CHARGE syndrome; Jesse is profoundly deaf and has a serious heart condition which resulted in open heart surgery at the age of five months. She is learning British Sign Language and is vocal about the rights of parents of deaf children to have free access to learning sign language. In October 2013 there was a debate in Parliament led by the NDCS (National Deaf Children's Society) where both Rachel and Jesse were mentioned.

Equipment
Rachel Goswell's 1993 Slowdive guitar rig consisted of a Fender '72 Telecaster Thinline, a Boss OD-2 Turbo Overdrive, a Yamaha FX-500 Multi-FX unit and a Roland JC-77 Jazz Chorus 2x10 combo amp. Since Slowdive's reunion in 2014, Rachel Goswell's main guitar on tour is a Custom77 The Roxy – Hollowbody.

Discography
 Slowdive

Just for a Day (1991) 
Souvlaki (1993) 
Pygmalion (1995)
Slowdive (2017)

Mojave 3

Ask Me Tomorrow (1995) 
Out of Tune (1998) 
Excuses for Travellers (2000) 
Spoon and Rafter (2003) 
Puzzles Like You (2006)

Minor Victories
Minor Victories (2016)

The Soft Cavalry
The Soft Cavalry (2019)

Rachel Goswell
 The Sleep Shelter EP (17 May 2004) 4AD BAD 2402
 Waves Are Universal (14 June 2004) 4AD CAD 2414
 Coastline / Plucked single (14 February 2005) 4AD TAD 2501

Notes and references

Notes

References

External links 

 
 Rachel Goswell 4AD page
 

1971 births
Living people
4AD artists
Deaf musicians
English women guitarists
English guitarists
English women singer-songwriters
People from Fareham
Women rock singers
Women bass guitarists
Shoegaze musicians
English deaf people
21st-century English women singers
21st-century English singers
21st-century English bass guitarists